Gotav (also Romanized as Gotāv; also known as Gotāb, Gūtāb, Gūtu, and Kotāv) is a village in Harang Rural District, Kukherd District, Bastak County, Hormozgan Province, Iran. At the 2006 census, its population was 337, in 84 families.

References 

الكوخردى ، محمد ، بن يوسف، (كُوخِرد حَاضِرَة اِسلامِيةَ عَلي ضِفافِ نَهر مِهران) الطبعة الثالثة ،دبى: سنة 199۷ للميلاد Mohammed Kookherdi (1997) Kookherd, an Islamic civil at Mehran river, third edition: Dubai
محمدیان، کوخری، محمد ، “ (به یاد کوخرد) “، ج1. ج2. چاپ اول، دبی: سال انتشار 2003 میلادی Mohammed Kookherdi Mohammadyan (2003), Beyade Kookherd, third edition: Dubai.
محمدیان، کوخردی ، محمد ،  «شهرستان بستک و بخش کوخرد»  ، ج۱. چاپ اول، دبی: سال انتشار ۲۰۰۵ میلادی Mohammed Kookherdi Mohammadyan (2005), Shahrestan  Bastak & Bakhshe Kookherd, First edition: Dubai.
عباسی ، قلی، مصطفی،  «بستک وجهانگیریه»، چاپ اول، تهران : ناشر: شرکت انتشارات جهان
سلامى، بستكى، احمد.  (بستک در گذرگاه تاریخ)  ج2 چاپ اول، 1372 خورشيدى
اطلس گیتاشناسی استان‌های ایران (Gitashenasi Province Atlas of Iran)

External links 

 

Populated places in Bastak County